HNoMS Thor was a monitor built for the Royal Norwegian Navy in 1871. She was decommissioned in 1918, long after her heavy guns were outdated. She was considered an improvement on the Skorpionen class of monitors, with heavier armour and a wider beam.

The name was a reference to the Norse god Thor. The earlier monitor Mjølner was named after Thor's hammer.

Details
Thor was armed with two heavy rifled muzzleloaders in a revolving turret. She had 7 inches of iron armour on her deck, and her turret was protected by 14 inches of iron armour.

Wreck
After decommissioning, Thor was intended for scrapping.  On 7 March 1919, while being towed to the scrapyard, the ship was caught in a storm that broke the towing cable, stranding Thor on an island outside Verdens Ende in Vestfold.  Two crew members were killed in the accident.  Thor later sank in shallow water.  A salvage operation removed parts of the ship, but the wreck remains largely intact and now lies at a depth of 8 to 14 meters southwest of Verdens Ende.

Thor is one of only three accessible monitor vessels in the world, the others being USS Monitor, which lies at about 60 meters some 42 kilometers southeast of Cape Hatteras, North Carolina and the other being HMVS Cerberus, in 5 metres of water in Victoria, Australia.

Notable crew
 Johan Oscar Smith, founder of Brunstad Christian Church served as a gunnery officer on Thor in 1898.

References
 Naval History via Flix: KNM Thor, access date 16 January 2006

 

Monitors of the Royal Norwegian Navy
Ships built in Horten
1872 ships
Maritime incidents in 1919
Shipwrecks in the North Sea